The State of Greater Lebanon, informally known as French Lebanon, was a state declared on 1 September 1920, which became the Lebanese Republic in May 1926, and is the predecessor of modern Lebanon.

The state was declared on 1 September 1920, following Decree 318 of 31 August 1920, as a League of Nations Mandate under the proposed terms of the Mandate for Syria and the Lebanon which was to be ratified in 1923. When the Ottoman Empire was formally split up by the Treaty of Sèvres in 1920, it was decided that four of its territories in the Middle East should be League of Nations mandates temporarily governed by the United Kingdom and France on behalf of the League. The British were given Palestine and Iraq, while the French were given a mandate over Syria and Lebanon.

General Gouraud proclaimed the establishment of the state with its present boundaries after splitting a few Syrian villages on the southern and western borders with Lebanon and adding them to Lebanon and with Beirut as its capital. The new territory was granted a flag, merging the French flag with the Lebanese cedar.

Background

Name and Conception

The term Greater Lebanon alludes to the almost doubling of the size of the Mount Lebanon Mutasarrifate, the existing former autonomous region, as a result of the incorporation of the former Ottoman districts of Tripoli and Sidon as well as the Bekaa Valley. The Mutasarrifate had been established in 1861 to protect the local Christian population by the European powers under the terms of the Règlement Organique. The term, in French "Le Grand Liban", was first used by the Lebanese intellectuals Bulus Nujaym and Albert Naccache, during the buildup to the 1919 Paris Peace Conference.

Nujaym was building on his widely read 1908 work La question du Liban, a 550-page analysis which was to become the foundation for arguments in favor of a Greater Lebanon. The work argued that a significant extension of Lebanon's boundaries was required for economic success. The boundaries suggested by Nujaym as representing the "Liban de la grande époque" were drawn from the map of the 1860-64 French expedition, which has been cited as an example of a modern map having "predicted the nation instead of just recording it".

Paris Peace Conference

On 27 October 1919, the Lebanese delegation led by Maronite Patriarch Elias Peter Hoayek presented the Lebanese aspirations in a memorandum to the Paris Peace Conference. This included a significant extension of the frontiers of the Lebanon Mutasarrifate, arguing that the additional areas constituted natural parts of Lebanon, despite the fact that the Christian community would not be a clear majority in such an enlarged state. The quest for the annexation of agricultural lands in the Bekaa and Akkar was fueled by existential fears following the death of nearly half of the Mount Lebanon Mutasarrifate population in the Great Famine; the Maronite church and the secular leaders sought a state that could better provide for its people. The areas to be added to the Mutasarrifate included the coastal towns of Beirut, Tripoli, Sidon and Tyre and their respective hinterlands, all of which belonged to the Beirut Vilayet, together with four Kazas of the Syria Vilayet (Baalbek, the Bekaa, Rashaya and Hasbaya).

Proclamation

Following the peace conference, the French were awarded the French Mandate for Syria and the Lebanon, under which the definition of Lebanon was still to be set by the French. Most of the territory was controlled by the Occupied Enemy Territory Administration, with the remainder controlled for a short time by the Arab Kingdom of Syria until the latter's defeat in July 1920. Following the decisive Battle of Maysalun, Lebanese Maronites openly celebrated the Arab defeat.

On 24 August 1920, French Prime Minister Alexandre Millerand  wrote to Archbishop Khoury: "Your country's claims on the Bekaa, that you have recalled for me, have been granted. On instructions from the French government, General Gouraud has proclaimed at Zahle's Grand Kadri Hotel, the incorporation into Lebanon of the territory that extends up to the summit of the Anti-Lebanon range and of Hermon. This is the Greater Lebanon that France wishes to form to assure your country of its natural borders."

World War II and Later history

Syria-Lebanon Campaign 

During World War II when the Vichy government assumed power over French territory in 1940, General Henri Fernand Dentz was appointed as high commissioner of Lebanon. This new turning point led to the resignation of Lebanese president Émile Eddé on 4 April 1941. After five days, Dentz appointed Alfred Naqqache for a presidency period that lasted only three months. The Vichy authorities allowed Nazi Germany to move aircraft and supplies through Syria to Iraq where they were used against British forces. Britain, fearing that Nazi Germany would gain full control of Lebanon and Syria by pressure on the weak Vichy government, sent its army into Syria and Lebanon.

After the fighting ended in Lebanon, General Charles de Gaulle visited the area. Under various political pressures from both inside and outside Lebanon, de Gaulle decided to recognize the independence of Lebanon. On 26 November 1941, General Georges Catroux announced that Lebanon would become independent under the authority of the Free French government.

Levant Crisis and Independence 

Elections were held in 1943 and on 8 November 1943, the new Lebanese government unilaterally abolished the mandate. The French reacted by throwing the new government into prison. In the face of international pressure, the French released the government officials on 22 November 1943, and accepted the independence of Lebanon.

In October, the international community recognized the independence of Lebanon, which was admitted as a founding member of the United Nations along with Syria. On 19 December 1945, an Anglo-French agreement was eventually signed – both British forces from Syria and French forces from Lebanon were to be withdrawn by early 1946.

Government
The first Lebanese constitution was promulgated on 23 May 1926, and subsequently amended several times. Modeled after that of the French Third Republic, it provided for a bicameral parliament with Chamber of Deputies and a Senate (although the latter was eventually dropped), a President, and a Council of Ministers, or cabinet. The president was to be elected by the Chamber of Deputies for one six-year term and could not be reelected until a six-year period had elapsed; deputies were to be popularly elected along confessional lines.

A custom of selecting major political officers, as well as top ranks within the public administration, according to the proportion of the principal sects in the population was strengthened during this period. Thus, for example, the president ought to be a Maronite Christian, the prime minister a Sunni Muslim, and the speaker of the Chamber of Deputies a Shia Muslim. A Greek Orthodox and a Druze would always be present in the cabinet. This practice increased sectarian tension by providing excessive power to the Maronite president (such as the ability to choose the prime minister), and hindered the formation of a Lebanese national identity. Theoretically, the Chamber of Deputies performed the legislative function, but in fact bills were prepared by the executive and submitted to the Chamber of Deputies, which passed them virtually without exception. Under the Constitution, the French high commissioner still exercised supreme power, an arrangement that initially brought objections from the Lebanese nationalists. Nevertheless, Charles Debbas, a Greek Orthodox, was elected the first president of Lebanon three days after the adoption of the Constitution.

At the end of Debbas's first term in 1932, Bishara al-Khuri and Émile Eddé competed for the office of president, thus dividing the Chamber of Deputies. To break the deadlock, some deputies suggested Shaykh Muhammad al Jisr, who was chairman of the Council of Ministers and the Muslim leader of Tripoli, as a compromise candidate. However, French high commissioner Henri Ponsot suspended the constitution on 9 May 1932, and extended the term of Debbas for one year; in this way he prevented the election of a Muslim as president. Dissatisfied with Ponsot's conduct, the French authorities replaced him with Count Damien de Martel, who, on 30 January 1934, appointed Habib Pacha Es-Saad as president for a one-year term (later extended for an additional year).

Émile Eddé was elected president on 30 January 1936. A year later, he partially reestablished the Constitution of 1926 and proceeded to hold elections for the Chamber of Deputies. However, the Constitution was again suspended by the French high commissioner in September 1939, at the outbreak of World War II.

High Commissioners of the Levant 

The High Commissioner of the Levant, named after 1941 the General Delegate to Syria and Lebanon, was the highest ranking authority representing France in the French-mandated countries of Syria and Lebanon. Its office was based in Beirut, Lebanon in the Pine Residence and is now the official residence of the French ambassador to Lebanon. The office was first held by Henri Gouraud. Jean Chiappe should have held office on 24 November 1940 but the aircraft taking him to Lebanon was shot down by mistake by Italian air force taking part in the Battle of Cape Spartivento near Sardinia. The pilot, Henri Guillaumet, the other members of the crew including Marcel Reine, the two passengers, Chiappe, his leader of the cabinet, were killed. Last to hold office was Étienne Paul-Émile-Marie Beynet which began on 23 January 1944 and ended on 1 September 1946, 5 months after the withdrawal of French forces in Lebanon.

Education
The French mandate promoted French culture and the French language in education. English was also common in higher education. Foreign mission schools were the main institutions for education, providing higher standards of education than under Ottoman administration, with no state-run system.

Demographics 
The first and only official religious census of Greater Lebanon was carried out in 1932 which concludes that the population is roughly split equality between Muslims and Christians, the largest sects being Maronite Christianity, Sunni Islam and Shia Islam.

In total 785,542 people lived within the boundaries of Greater Lebanon in 1932.

See also 
Emir Majid Arslan II
Sykes-Picot Agreement
Patriarch Elias Hoayek
San Remo conference
Mount Lebanon
French Mandate of Syria
Battle of Maysalun (1920).
Syria-Lebanon Campaign (1941).
List of French possessions and colonies
French colonial empire

References

Bibliography
  (note: see also summary here)

External links 
 A concise history of Lebanon
 Glossary -- Lebanon
 Milestone Dates in Lebanon's Modern History
 Library of Congress - Research - Country Studies - Lebanon - The French Mandate

French Mandate for Syria and the Lebanon
 
League of Nations mandates
Former countries in the Middle East
States and territories established in 1920
1943 disestablishments in Asia
Former countries of the interwar period